The 2010 FC Tokyo season was the team's 12th as a member of J.League Division 1.

Competitions

Player statistics

Other pages
 J. League official site

Tokyo
2010